Charles Douville Coburn (June 19, 1877 – August 30, 1961) was an American actor and theatrical producer. He was nominated for a Best Supporting Actor Academy Award three times – in The Devil and Miss Jones (1941), The More the Merrier (1943), and The Green Years (1946) – winning for his performance in The More the Merrier. He was honored with a star on the Hollywood Walk of Fame in 1960 for his contribution to the film industry.

Biography

Coburn was born in Macon, Georgia, the son of Scots-Irish Americans Emma Louise Sprigman (May 11, 1838 Springfield, Ohio – November 12, 1896 Savannah, Georgia) and Moses Douville Coburn (April 27, 1834 Savannah – December 27, 1902 Savannah). Growing up in Savannah, he started out at age 14 doing odd jobs at the local Savannah Theater, handing out programs, ushering, or being the doorman. By age 17 or 18, he was the theater manager. He later became an actor, making his debut on Broadway in 1901. Coburn formed an acting company with actress Ivah Wills in 1905. They married in 1906. In addition to managing the company, the couple performed frequently on Broadway.

After his wife's death in 1937, Coburn relocated to Los Angeles, California and began film work. He won an Academy Award for Best Supporting Actor for his role as a retired millionaire playing Cupid in The More the Merrier in 1943. He was also nominated for The Devil and Miss Jones in 1941 and The Green Years in 1946. Other notable film credits include Of Human Hearts (1938), The Lady Eve (1941), Kings Row (1942), The Constant Nymph (1943), Heaven Can Wait (1943), Wilson (1944), Impact (1949), The Paradine Case (1947), Everybody Does It (1950), Has Anybody Seen My Gal? (1952), Monkey Business (1952), Gentlemen Prefer Blondes (1953), and John Paul Jones (1959). He usually played comedic parts, but his roles in Kings Row and Wilson showed his dramatic versatility.

For his contributions to motion pictures, in 1960, Coburn was honored with a star on the Hollywood Walk of Fame at 6268 Hollywood Boulevard.

Political activity

In the 1940s, Coburn served as vice-president of the Motion Picture Alliance for the Preservation of American Ideals, a group opposed to leftist infiltration and proselytization in Hollywood during the Cold War. Born and raised in the southern state of Georgia, Coburn was a member of the White Citizens' Councils, a white supremacist group which opposed racial integration.

A staunch Republican, Coburn supported Thomas Dewey in the 1944 United States presidential election.

Personal life
Coburn married Ivah Wills (born August 19, 1878) on January 29, 1906, in Atlanta, Georgia. They had six children. Ivah died on December 3, 1937, in New York City of congestive heart failure, aged 59. The 82 year-old Coburn married Winifred Natzka on June 30, 1959, in Los Angeles. She was the widow of the New Zealand bass opera singer Oscar Natzka. They had one child, a daughter.

In the 1940s, Coburn made his home at the National Arts Club in New York City. His late wife's mother lived there with him.

Coburn died of a heart attack on August 30, 1961, at age 84 in New York City. Winifred moved to New Zealand.

Complete filmography

Radio appearances

See also

 List of actors with Academy Award nominations

References

Further reading

External links

 
 
 

1877 births
1961 deaths
20th-century American male actors
Actors from Savannah, Georgia
American segregationists
American white supremacists
American male film actors
American male stage actors
American people of Scotch-Irish descent
Best Supporting Actor Academy Award winners
California Republicans
Citizens' Councils
Male actors from Georgia (U.S. state)
Neo-Confederates